Rhyzodiastes spissicornis is a species of ground beetle in the subfamily Rhysodinae. It was described by Léon Fairmaire in 1895. It is found on the Malay Peninsula (Malaysia).

References

Rhyzodiastes
Beetles of Asia
Insects of Malaysia
Beetles described in 1895
Taxa named by Léon Fairmaire